Robert Verbeek (born 26 July 1961) is a Dutch former soccer player and subsequently a manager. He currently coaches the first football squad of RV & AV Sparta. Verbeek is the younger brother of former Oman manager Pim Verbeek. As a player, he featured for Sparta Rotterdam, where he retired at the age of 21.

Coaching career
Verbeek is an experienced coach whose strength lies in the development of youth players. He started his coaching career following his retirement as a youth coach at Sparta Rotterdam and also worked for amateur teams NRC Ommoord (1985–1988), Neptunus and Unitas. In 1988, he was appointed by PSV Eindhoven, where he worked as a coach for a total period of eight years. In this period he assisted coaches like Guus Hiddink and Sir Bobby Robson. He worked with famous players like Romario and Ronaldo, who became famous after their spell with PSV. From 1996 to 2000 he started as a head coach and managed FC Dordrecht, but did not book any notable results and the team balanced in halfway positions in the Eerste Divisie.

In 2000, he coached Amsterdam based ambitious amateur side FC Türkiyemspor, but moved to the United Arab Emirates a year later to coach both Al-Jazeera Club and Al-Shabbab. On 1 January 2004 he returned to the Netherlands and started at FC Dordrecht for the second time, this time to replace Jos van Eck. In March 2005 he decided to leave the club due to disappointing results and to try his luck abroad. FC Dordrecht had already appointed Jurrie Koolhof as their new manager for the upcoming season. As a result, he was appointed by the Singaporean football association, where he coached the Singapore under 15 and under 16 squads. In 2007, he was in charge of J. League club Omiya Ardija.

Managerial statistics

References

External links

1961 births
Living people
Dutch footballers
Sparta Rotterdam players
Dutch football managers
Expatriate football managers in Japan
J1 League managers
Omiya Ardija managers
Footballers from Rotterdam
FC Türkiyemspor managers
Association footballers not categorized by position
Dutch expatriate football managers
Ido's Football Club managers